A specific legacy (or specific bequest) is a testamentary gift of a precisely identifiable object, distinguished from all other things of the same kind — such as, a gift of a particular piece of jewelry.

See also
 Specific devise
 Testator
 Will (law)

References

Common law
Inheritance
Wills and trusts